Whitehawk or similar terms may refer to:

Whitehawk, a suburb of Brighton, England, and:
Whitehawk F.C., a football club based there
Whitehawk Hill, a hill that the suburb lies alongside
Whitehawk Camp, a Neolithic site on Whitehawk Hill
Whitehawk Hill transmitting station
Whitehawk, California, United States, a census-designated place in Plumas County
White hawk, Leucopternis albicollis, a bird species
The VH-60N "White Hawk" helicopter, a variant of the Sikorsky S-70
Frederikshavn White Hawks, an ice hockey team in Denmark
Waterloo White Hawks, a baseball team in Iowa, USA